"The Night Owls" is a song by Australian rock band Little River Band. It was released in September 1981 as the lead single from their sixth studio album Time Exposure. It is the first song to feature new bassist Wayne Nelson on vocals.

"The Night Owls" peaked at number 46 on the Australian Kent Music Report singles chart and at number 6 on the US Billboard Hot 100.

Track listings
 Australian 7" (Capitol Records – CP-570)
A. "The Night Owls" - 3:45
B. "Suicide Boulevard" - 3:23

 North American 7" (Capitol Records – A-5033)
A. "The Night Owls" - 3:45
B. "Suicide Boulevard" - 3:23

 Spanish version (Capitol Records – 10C .414)
A. "La Noche de los Buhos"	- 3:55
B. "Boulevard del Suicidio" - 4:11

Charts

References

1981 singles
Little River Band songs
Capitol Records singles
Song recordings produced by George Martin
1981 songs
Songs written by Graeham Goble